Ernie Adams (20 January 1878 – 28 November 1946) was an Australian rules footballer who played with Melbourne in the Victorian Football League (VFL).

Notes

External links 
		
 

1878 births
1946 deaths
Australian rules footballers from Melbourne
Melbourne Football Club players
People from Collingwood, Victoria